The Georgi Sava Rakovski Bolhrad High School (Bolhrads′ka himnaziya im. Founded in 1858 at the request of Bolhrad's Bessarabian Bulgarian population, the Bolhrad Gymnasium is regarded as the oldest high school of the Bulgarian National Revival.

Bolgrad Glacier in Sentinel Range, Antarctica is named after the Bulgarian High School of Bolhrad.

History
The Russo-Turkish Wars of the late 18th and early 19th century prompted many Bulgarians to leave the Ottoman Empire and settle in the southern domains of the Russian Empire and specifically in the Governorate of Bessarabia. These Bessarabian Bulgarians, together with Gagauz people founded 43 villages in Bessarabia, as well as the cities of Bolhrad and Comrat. As early as 1832, Ukrainian Slavist Yuriy Venelin had suggested that Bolhrad become a centre of Bulgarian culture and education in the Russian Empire; however, the idea was not put into practice at the time.

After the Crimean War (1853–1856), southern Bessarabia (including Bolhrad) came back under the rule of the autonomous Principality of Moldavia. In 1857, Nicolae Vogoride, a Moldavian statesman of Bulgarian origin, became caimacam (temporary replacement of prince) of Moldavia. Bulgarian revolutionary Georgi Sava Rakovski, the school's modern patron, personally lobbied in front of Vogoride for the high school's opening. On 10 June 1858 in Iaşi, the caimacam granted trust committee members Nikola Parushev and Panayot Grekov a charter permitting the establishment of the high school. The charter outlined the goals which the school's establishment set, as well as some basic rules. The high school was open to all colonists, so long as they were of Eastern Orthodox confession. Graduating from the Bolhrad High School would require a total of seven years of education, the first three of which were regarded as progymnasium, or junior high school. Latin, Bulgarian, Romanian and Church Slavonic were part of the curriculum. The school's own edifice was completed in 1873. The gymnasium was financially independent from state and church, as it relied on income from rents.

The first director of the Bolhrad High School was Sava Radulov of Panagyurishte. Between 1858 and 1879, 685 people enrolled at the gymnasium and 214 graduated; of these 214, 203 were ethnic Bulgarians. Notable students included Aleksandar Malinov, Angel Kanchev, Danail Nikolaev, Dimitar Agura, Dimitar Grekov, Ivan Kolev and Aleksandar Teodorov-Balan.

In 1879, after southern Bessarabia reverted once again to the Russian Empire, the school gradually lost its entirely Bulgarian character. A significant part of the students, however, remained Bulgarians, and the Bulgarian language, history and geography have been part of the gymnasium's curriculum for most of its later existence, including today.

References

External links
 Bolhrad High School website

See also
Fontanka School

Educational institutions established in 1858
School buildings completed in 1873
Buildings and structures in Odesa Oblast
Schools in Ukraine
Bessarabian Bulgarians
History of Moldavia (1822–1859)
Kingdom of Romania
Bessarabia Governorate
1858 establishments in the Russian Empire
Secondary schools in Ukraine